Clube de Desportos da Costa do Sol, commonly known as CD Costa do Sol, is a Mozambican basketball team from Maputo. It is the basketball section of the multi-sports club, founded in 1955.

The Costa do Sol women's team were the runners-up in the 2022 FIBA Africa Women's Champions Cup, losing to Alexandria Sporting Club in the finals.

Honours

Men's team 
Mozambican Basketball League
Winners (1): 2001
Runners-up (1): 2019

Women's team 
FIBA Africa Women's Clubs Champions Cup

 Runners-up (1): 2022

References

Basketball teams in Mozambique
Basketball teams established in 1955
Sport in Maputo